Renato Moreira Nunes de Queirós (born 20 July 1977) is a Portuguese retired footballer who played as a forward.

Club career
Born in Amarante, Porto District, Queirós started playing football with hometown club Amarante FC. He would go on to represent modest Portuguese sides: F.C. Felgueiras, F.C. Lixa and A.D. Sanjoanense (with whom, in 2001–02 season, he scored four goals in as many games in the Portuguese Cup).

Subsequently, Queirós made his debut in the Primeira Liga, with F.C. Paços de Ferreira, where he netted 11 times in 54 official appearances, moving to U.D. Leiria for 2004–05. He rejoined the former for three further campaigns but, having been rarely used, signed for Khazar Lankaran FK of the Azerbaijan Premier League in July 2008.

Unsettled, Queirós returned home after only one year, joining second division team C.D. Feirense. In the summer of 2010 the 33-year-old moved to Boavista FC, retiring in January 2012 due to injury problems.

References

External links

1977 births
Living people
People from Amarante, Portugal
Portuguese footballers
Association football forwards
Primeira Liga players
Liga Portugal 2 players
Segunda Divisão players
Amarante F.C. players
F.C. Felgueiras players
F.C. Lixa players
A.D. Sanjoanense players
F.C. Paços de Ferreira players
U.D. Leiria players
C.D. Feirense players
Boavista F.C. players
Azerbaijan Premier League players
Khazar Lankaran FK players
Portuguese expatriate footballers
Expatriate footballers in Azerbaijan
Portuguese expatriate sportspeople in Azerbaijan
Sportspeople from Porto District